The Swatantra Party was an Indian classical liberal political party, that existed from 1959 to 1974. It was founded by C. Rajagopalachari in reaction to what he felt was the Jawaharlal Nehru-dominated Indian National Congress's increasingly socialist and statist outlook.

It had a number of distinguished leaders, most of them old Congressmen, for example, C. Rajagopalachari, Tanguturi Prakasam Pantulu, Minoo Masani, N.G. Ranga, Darshan Singh Pheruman, Udham Singh Nagoke and K.M. Munshi. The provocation for the formation of the party was the left turn which the Congress took at Avadi and the Nagpur Resolutions. Swatantra stood for a market-based economy with the "Licence Raj" dismantled, although it opposed laissez faire policies.  Considered to be on the economic right of the Indian political spectrum, Swatantra was not a religion-based party, unlike the Hindu-nationalist Bharatiya Jana Sangh. In 1960, Rajagopalachari and his colleagues drafted a 21-point manifesto detailing why Swatantra had to be formed, even though they were hitherto Congressmen and associates of Nehru during the struggle for independence. The Prime Minister Jawaharlal Nehru was highly critical of Swatantra, dubbing the party as belonging to "the middle ages of lords, castles and zamindars".

Swatantra Party of India

Electoral history
In the 1962 general election, the first after its formation, Swatantra received 7.89 percent of the total votes and won 18 seats in the third Lok Sabha (1962–67). It emerged as the main opposition to the dominant Congress in four states—Bihar, Rajasthan, Gujarat, and Orissa. By the next general election in 1967, Swatantra had become a significant force in some parts of India; it won 8.7 percent of the votes and became the single-largest opposition party in the fourth Lok Sabha (1967–71) with 44 seats. In 1971, Swatantra joined a "Grand Alliance" of parties from across the political spectrum who aimed to defeat Prime Minister Indira Gandhi. The party secured eight seats, winning 3% of the votes. The next year, in 1972, its founder Rajagopalachari died, and Swatantra declined rapidly. By 1974, it had dissolved with many of its members joining the Charan Singh-led Bharatiya Lok Dal.

Ideology

Fundamental principles 
First and foremost the Swatantra Party committed to social justice and equality of opportunity of all people 'without distinction of religion, caste, occupation, or political affiliation'.

The party felt that progress, welfare, and happiness of the people could be achieved by giving maximum freedom to individuals with the state minimising intervention. The state should replace its intervention with fostering the Indian tradition of helping others in people.

In particular, the party believed that the state should adhere to the Fundamental Rights guaranteed by the Constitution of India and, in particular, should compensate individuals if their property had to be acquired for public purposes. It also believed in giving citizens full freedom to educate their children as they wanted. It recognised the need for increasing food production and sought to do that by giving peasants full land rights and incentives for increasing production in agriculture. In industry, it sought to reduce state presence only to the minimum necessary to supplement private enterprise and in national services like the Railways. It sought to do away with controls on trade and commerce. However, it committed against unreasonable profits, prices, and dividends. It believed in placing equal emphasis on the development of capital goods industries, consumer goods industries, and rural and small industries. In the fields of taxation and state expenditure, it believed in thrift and called that taxation should suffice for carrying on of administration and social and economic activities taken upon by the state but it should not depress capital formation and private investment. The government should also desist from running abnormally large deficits or taking foreign loans that are beyond the capacity of the country to repay. In particular, it resisted unnecessary expansion of the bureaucracy.

While standing for minimising state intervention in the economy the Swatantra Party committed to securing a fair deal for labour, correlating wages to increased productivity and workers' right to collectively bargain. It also gave their members full freedom to question and criticize any point not included in the fundamental principles of that party.

Others 
Party's fundamental principles had not covered several issues like foreign policy, national language, state reorganisation and religious and social reform.

The party was generally opposed to Communism and in 1969, urged the Indian government to ban the 3 major Communist parties in India at that time, namely the CPI, CPI(M) and the Naxalites due to their open or tacit support for armed struggles, which the Swatantra party viewed as a major security threat to the nation.

In foreign affairs, it opposed non-alignment and a close relationship with the USSR and advocated an intimate connection with the United States and Western Europe.

Decline and legacy
Swatantra failed mainly because there was as yet no space in Indian politics for a centrist party. Also, the rich and middle peasants were not yet fully and irrevocably alienated from Congress, especially as cooperative farming had been put in cold storage and land ceiling laws actually posed little threat to the existing holdings. On the other hand, they were the major beneficiaries of several government policies and measures: reduction of land revenue and extension of services including provision of rural credit, improved transport, irrigation, and electrification. By and large, the business class found that planning, the public sector, and government regulations did not block its growth and, instead, in many respects, helped it to develop. The mixed economy also left enough scope for its expansion. Above all, though steady in pursuing its developmental and reformist agenda, the Nehru government was quite moderate in dealing with and conciliatory towards the propertied classes. Even the princes and landlords had not been wiped out and had been consoled with compensation and other economic concessions. Lastly, the Congress right realised that so long as Nehru was alive his position in the country was unassailable; it, therefore, showed no inclination to leave. On the other hand, when Congress split in 1969 and Congress (O) emerged as a political force, the reason for the existence of Swatantra as a separate party disappeared, for the former was much more potent as a right-wing party.

When Nagabhairava Jaya Prakash Narayana, the founder-leader of Lok Satta Party, was asked in 2014 whether he saw his party "as a modern-day re-embodiment of the Swatantra Party", he replied "in a large measure, yes. ... The founders of the Swatantra Party were visionaries and had India followed their leadership, we could have been where China is today, economically."

See also

 Liberalism in India
 Piloo Mody
 S. V. Raju
 V. P. Menon
 H. Ajmal Khan
 Venkatesh Geriti
 Indian National Congress breakaway parties
 R. C. Cooper

Notes

References

Other References 
 Bipan Chandra et al. India Since Independence. Penguin India. 2008 [2011 digital edition].
 Mariadas Ruthnaswamy. "Swatantra Party and its leaders". Swarajya. 30 July 1960.
 Mariadas Ruthnaswamy. "Is Swatantra inspiring enough?". Swarajya. 22 October 1960.
 H. R. Pasricha. The Swatantra Party – Victory in Defeat. Rajaji Foundation. 2002.
 Howard L. Erdman. "India's Swatantra Party". Public Affairs, vol. 36, iss. 4, pp. 394–410. Winter 1963–64.
 Howard L. Erdman. The Swatantra Party and Indian Conservatism. Cambridge University Press. 1967. Digitized by the Internet Archive in 2013.
 Madhavankutty Pillai. "Last Man Standing". Open. 5 April 2014.
 Rajmohan Gandhi. Rajaji: A Life. Penguin India. 1997.
 Ramachandra Guha. India After Gandhi: The History of the World's Largest Democracy. HarperCollins. 2008.
 Rasam Vasanti. Swatantra Party: a political biography. Dattson Publishers, Nagpur. 1997.
 Rasam Vasanti. "Role of Swantantra Party as an Opposition Party (National Level)". Readings on Parliamentary Opposition.

External links
 C. Rajagopalachari : Save freedom. Why Swatantra, 1960
 Minoo Masani: To provide A Democratic Alternative. Why Swatantra, 1960
 K. M. Munshi: To Restore Fundamental Rights. Why Swatantra, 1960
 N. G. Ranga: To Preserve Family Economy. Why Swatantra, 1960
 Rediff On The NeT: Rajmohan Gandhi on C Rajagopalachari and the birth of the Swatantra Party
 Revive the Swatantra Party
 Minoo Masani and the Swatantra Party

 
1959 establishments in India
1974 disestablishments in India
Classical liberal parties
Liberal conservative parties
Defunct political parties in India
Political parties established in 1959
Political parties disestablished in 1974
Conservative parties in India